Podborze may refer to the following places:
Podborze, Lesser Poland Voivodeship (south Poland)
Podborze, Maków County in Masovian Voivodeship (east-central Poland)
Podborze, Subcarpathian Voivodeship (south-east Poland)
Podborze, Ostrów Mazowiecka County in Masovian Voivodeship (east-central Poland)